Ludvonga II (c. 1855 - 1872) was the Crown Prince of Swaziland, son of Mswati II of Swaziland.   His mother's clan was Khumalo. As a result of internal power struggles within the royal family, he was poisoned and died in 1872 before he could take the throne. He was succeeded by his half-brother Mbandzeni, who was adopted by Ludvonga's mother.

References

1855 births
1874 deaths
Murdered royalty
Swazi royalty
Heirs apparent who never acceded
Sons of kings